Chu Yuanmeng (born 21 November 1999 ) is a Chinese biathlete. She competed at the 2022 Winter Olympics, in  Women's pursuit, Women's individual, Women's sprint, Mixed relay, and Women's relay.

She competed at the 2017 Winter Military World Games, Biathlon World Championships 2016, Biathlon World Championships 2019,  Biathlon World Championships 2020.

References

External links 

 Yuanmeng Chu of Team China and Emma Lunder of Team Canada compete Photo by Maddie Meyer - Getty Images
 

1999 births
Chinese female biathletes
Living people
Biathletes at the 2022 Winter Olympics
Olympic biathletes of China